Diplura is a genus of South American curtain web spiders that was first described by C. L. Koch in 1850. It is found in South America and Cuba belonging to the subfamily Diplurinae. They possess a lyra on their prolateral maxillae. Diplura species can be distinguished from Trechona sp. by the number of setae on this lyra.  They differ from Harmonicon sp. by the leg formula (1423 in Harmonicon, rather than 4123 in other genera of the subfamily) and the shape of the lyra bristles.

Species
 it contains eighteen species:
Diplura annectens (Bertkau, 1880) – Brazil
Diplura argentina (Canals, 1931) – Argentina
Diplura catharinensis (Mello-Leitão, 1927) – Brazil
Diplura erlandi (Tullgren, 1905) – Bolivia
Diplura garbei (Mello-Leitão, 1923) – Brazil
Diplura garleppi (Simon, 1892) – Bolivia
Diplura lineata (Lucas, 1857) – Brazil
Diplura macrura (C. L. Koch, 1841) (type) – Brazil
Diplura mapinguari Pedroso, Giupponi & Baptista, 2018 – Brazil
Diplura nigra (F. O. Pickard-Cambridge, 1896) – Brazil
Diplura paraguayensis (Gerschman & Schiapelli, 1940) – Paraguay, Argentina
Diplura parallela (Mello-Leitão, 1923) – Brazil
Diplura petrunkevitchi (Caporiacco, 1955) – Venezuela
Diplura riveti (Simon, 1903) – Ecuador
Diplura rodrigoi Pedroso, Giupponi & Baptista, 2018 – Brazil
Diplura sanguinea (F. O. Pickard-Cambridge, 1896) – Brazil
Diplura studiosa (Mello-Leitão, 1920) – Brazil
Diplura taunayi (Mello-Leitão, 1923) – Brazil

References

External links

Further reading
Ausserer, A. (1871a). "Beiträge zur Kenntniss der Arachniden-Familie der Territelariae Thorell (Mygalidae Autor)." Verh. zool.-bot. Ges. Wien 21: 117-224.
Baptista, R. L. C. and D. R., Pedroso (2005). Diplura lineata (Lucas, 1857): redescrição, sinonímias e notas sobre distribuição (Araneae: Dipluridae): 239.
Bücherl, W., A Timotheo da Costa & S. Lucas (1971). "Revisão de alguns tipos de aranhas caranguejeiras (Orthognatha) estabelecidos por Candido de Mello-Leitão e depositados no Museu Nacional do Rio." Mems Inst. Butantan 35: 117-138.
Cambridge, F. O. P.-. (1896). "On the Theraphosidae of the lower Amazons: being an account of the new genera and species of this group of spiders discovered during the expedition of the steamship "Faraday" up the river Amazons." Proc. zool. Soc. Lond. 1896: 716-766.
Mello-Leitão, C. F. d. (1924b). "Quelques arachnides nouveaux du Bresil." Ann. Soc. ent. Fr. 93: 179-187.
Mello-Leitão, C. F. d. (1941a). "Notas sobre a sistematica das aranhas com descrição de algumas novas especies Sul Americanas." Anais Acad. bras. Cienc. 13: 103-127.
Mello-Leitão, C. F. d. (1941b). "Catalogo das aranhas da Colombia." Anais Acad. bras. Cienc. 13: 233-300.
Vollrath, F. (1978). "A close relationship between two spiders (Arachnidae, Araneidae): Curimagua bayano synecious on a Diplura species." Psyche 85: 347-353.

Dipluridae
Mygalomorphae genera
Spiders of South America